The Riviera Nayarit is a nearly 200-mile stretch of coastline in Mexico between the historic port of San Blas, of Nayarit to where the Río Ameca empties into Banderas Bay, Nuevo Vallarta. 

Riviera Nayarit was named to promote the coastline of Nayarit and it includes such notable sites as Chacala Bay and Chacalilla.

Composition

The large coastline that occupies the Riviera Nayarit is made up, among others, by the main beaches and the following destinations, that are characterized by major hotels and a vast flora and fauna along the coastline:

 Nuevo Vallarta
 San Blas
 Jarretaderas
 Flamingos
 Bucerías
 La Cruz de Huanacaxtle
 Punta de Mita
 Litibú
 Sayulita
 San Francisco
 Lo de Marcos
 Rincón de Guayabitos
 La Peñita de Jaltemba
 Los Ayala
 El Capomo
 Bahía de Chacala
 Playa Platanitos

Archaeological sites  
The following locations have attractive archaeological sites: Alta Vista, Aticama, Bucerías, Sayulita famous for surfing, San Francisco, Lo de Marcos, Los Ayala, Rincón de Guayabitos, Peñita de Jaltemba and Las Varas.

See also
 Mexican Riviera
 Riviera Maya

References

Coasts
Geography of Mexico
Geography of Nayarit